Cho Jung-hun (Korean: 조정훈, born 7 October 1972) is a South Korean economist and politician. He is one of the co-founders of the minor liberal Transition Korea party, along with Lee Won-jae.

Early life and education 
Born in Seoul, Cho studied business administration at Yonsei University. After qualifying for Certified Public Accountant, he earned a master's degree in international development at John F. Kennedy School of Government. He passed the Young Professionals Programme of the World Bank.

Career 
From 2005 to 2008, Cho worked under the Technical Advisory Team of the World Bank where he worked as a part of negotiations for Kosovo independence and fiscal decentralization from Serbia. Then from 2012 to 2014, he worked at the World Bank Palestine branch and helped a negotiation between Palestine and Israel. Prior to entering politics, he worked at the World Bank Uzbekistan branch from 2014. In Uzbekistan, he was not only managing the development work of the bank, but was also consulting the economic development of the country. After returning to his home country South Korea, he served as the Vice Chairman for Future Consensus Institute and the director of Ajou Institute of Unification.

Politics 
Prior to the 2016 election, Cho was brought into the Democratic Party. He applied for the Democratic list but was not officially registered.

In 2020, Cho co-founded Transition Korea along with Lee Won-jae. He was elected to be the party president but resigned in order to run under the Platform Party (sister satellite party to the Democratic Party) banner. He ran 6th in the Platform Party list and was elected. On 12 May 2020, Cho officially left the Platform Party and returned to his original party.

Political positions 
He is politically syncretic, rejecting to be neither conservative nor liberal but being as pragmatic. He supports transition to negative regulation, as well as 300,000 won (≒ ￡200) of basic income.

He is also critical towards Anti-TADA, saying that "renovation is from market but it should not be prevented at the beginning". He also added that should TADA gives negative influences to taxi drivers, the benefits earned by TADA must be shared with taxi drivers rather than simply prohibiting the platform.

He gained much support for his first interpellation session where he maintained a polite attitude asking unconventional questions. He pointed out the exacerbating economic disparity in the Korean society, and invited fellow politicians to take measures to alleviate polarization.

Election results

General elections

Notes

References

External links 
 Cho Jung-hun on Facebook
 Cho Jung-hun on Instagram

1972 births
Living people
21st-century South Korean economists
Members of the National Assembly (South Korea)
Yonsei University alumni
Harvard Kennedy School alumni
People from Seoul